Grahame Thomas Hamilton (6 September 1939 – 25 June 1989) was an Australian swimmer. He competed in the men's 4 × 200 metre freestyle relay at the 1956 Summer Olympics.  His mother, Edna Davey was also an Olympic swimmer, competing in two events at the 1928 Summer Olympics.

References

External links
 

1939 births
1989 deaths
Olympic swimmers of Australia
Swimmers at the 1956 Summer Olympics
Australian male freestyle swimmers
20th-century Australian people